Harpalus szalliesi is a species of ground beetle in the subfamily Harpalinae. It was described by Kataev & Wrase in 1995.

References

szalliesi
Beetles described in 1995